The Sultanate of Aussa was a kingdom that existed in the Afar Region in eastern Ethiopia in the 18th and 20th centuries. 
It was considered to be the leading monarchy of the Afar people, to whom the other Afar rulers nominally acknowledged primacy.

The Ethiopian Empire nominally laid claim to the region but were met with harsh resistance as is known with the Afars and their skilled desert warfare in contrast to other areas of the empire and thus Aussa remained independent.

The Sultan Yayyo visited Rome along with countless other nobility from across East Africa to support the creation of Italian East Africa. This marked the end of the region's independence and it was disestablished and incorporated into Italian East Africa as a part of the Eritrean Governorate and the Harar Governorate.

The Sultanate was then incorporated into the Ethiopian Empire after World War II, but enjoyed considerable autonomy under Ethiopia until the rise of the Derg in the 1970s.

History

Imamate of Aussa

Afar society has traditionally been divided into petty kingdoms, each ruled by its own Sultan.

The Imamate of Aussa was carved out of the Sultanate of Harar and the Adal Sultanate   in 1577, when Muhammed Jasa moved his capital from Harar to Aussa (Asaita) with the split of the Adal Sultanate into Aussa and the Sultanate of Harar.

In 1647, the rulers of the Emirate of Harar broke away to form their own polity. The Imamate of Awsa was later destroyed by the local Mudaito Afar in 1672. Following the Awsa Imamate's demise, the Mudaito Afars founded their own kingdom, the Sultanate of Aussa.
At some point after 1672, Aussa declined in conjunction with Imam Umar Din bin Adam's recorded ascension to the throne.

Sultanate

In 1734, the Afar leader Data Kadafo, head of the Mudaito clan, seized power and established the Mudaito dynasty. This marked the start of a new and more sophisticated polity that would last into the colonial period. The primary symbol of the Sultan was a silver baton, which was considered to have magical properties. The influence of the sultanate extended into the Danakil lowlands of what is now Eritrea.

After 15 years of rule, Kadafo's son, Muhammäd Kedafu, succeeded him as Sultan. Muhammäd Kadafo three decades later bequeathed the throne to his own son, Aydahis, who in turn would reign for another twenty-two years. According to Richard Pankhurst, these relatively long periods of rule by modern standards pointed to a certain degree of political stability within the state.

Aussa's prosperity was coveted by Afars from neighbouring lands and in particular the Debne-Wemas, the strongest of the southern Adoimara.In the last decade of the 18th century they wished to capture the capital therefore they enlisted in the support of a number of Yemen matchlockmen from Aden. According to Krapf and Isenberg, were no less than a few hundred strong and enjoyed a complete monopoly of firepower.

William Cornwallis Harris had stated that the town's defence was organised by the ruler Yusuf ibn Idjahis, a brave and martial sultan, whose armoury boasted several cannons and matchlocks. He claimed that the defenders caught the would-be attackers off guard, while they were sleeping and cut all the throats of "all save one". The Debne-Wemas, according to this account were not intimidated by this reverse returned with fresh allies from the coast that they rallied and had achieved a murderous defeat of the Mudaitos. Yusuf was slain after which the town was sacked and the garrison was put to the sword.

The instability from this invasion had caused the Aussa state to suffer greatly. Aussa, once an important place had lost much of its political significance but had remained an extensive encampment frequented by innumerable Afars and Somalis as a place for perpetual fairs.

Sultan Mahammad ibn Hanfadhe defeated and killed Werner Munzinger in 1875, who was leading an Egyptian army into Ethiopia.

Colonial period
In 1865, the newly unified Italy bought Asseb from a local Sultan (which became the colony of Eritrea in 1890), and led Sultan Mahammad to sign several treaties with that country. As a result, the Ethiopian Emperor Menelik II stationed an army near Aussa to "make sure the Sultan of Awsa would not honor his promise of full cooperation with Italy" during the First Italo–Ethiopian War.

Count Tornielli declared to the Marquis of Salisbury that Article 5 of the treaty concluded between the Italians and the Sultan Mahammad Hanfare. That in a case of any other power trying to occupy Aussa or any parts of his territory, the Sultan must oppose it and declare that his nation is an Italian protectorate and must raise the Italian flag. According to Article 3, the Sultan had recognised the whole Danakil coast from Amphila Bay to Ras Doumeira as an Italian possession and had conceded the territories of Gambo Kona and Ablis as apart of Italian Eritrea.

Second Italo-Abyssinian War

During the Second Italian-Ethiopian War, the Sultan Mahammad Yayyo agreed to cooperate with the Italian invaders.

By 1st April 1936, Italian troops completed the occupation of the rich Sultanate of Aussa, bordering on French Somaliland.  As a result, in 1943 the reinstalled Ethiopian government sent a military expedition that captured Sultan Muhammad Yayyo and made one of his relatives Sultan.Upon a visit to Rome, Sultan Mohamed Yayyo met Benito Mussolini and declared a speech of his loyalty towards the Italian Empire in Palazzo Venezia.

Revival within modern Ethiopia
Sultan Alimirah often came into conflict with the central government over its encroachment on the authority of the Sultanate. Aussa, which had been more-or-less self-governing until the Sultan's ascension in 1944, had been greatly weakened in power by the centralising forces of Haile Selassie's government. In 1950 he withdrew from Asaita for two years in opposition, returning only two after following mediation by Fitawrari Yayyo.
The Sultan sought to unite the Afar people under an autonomous Sultanate, while remaining part of Ethiopia; they had been divided amongst the provinces of Hararghe, Shewa, Tigray, and Wollo.

In 1961, when it was clear the Eritrean federal arrangement was headed towards its demise, 55 Afar chieftains in Eritrea met and endorsed the idea of an Ethiopian Afar autonomy. Following the dissolution of Eritrea's federal government and its transformation into a centrally-administered province, Afar leaders met again in Assab in 1963 and supported the creation of an autonomous region. In 1964, Afar leaders went to Addis Ababa to present Haile Selassie with their proposal, but the effort came up empty-handed. Despite these encroachments and conflicts, the Sultan remained fundamentally loyal to the Emperor and Ethiopia; in turn, while he did not achieve the autonomous sultanate he desired, he enjoyed an appreciable level of autonomy in the areas of the Sultanate, almost unique amongst the many petty kingdoms incorporated into the Ethiopian state in the late 19th century. For example, while the government appointed a governor to the awrajja (district) of Aussa proper, the governor, rather than taking up residence in the capital of Asaita, instead sat in Bati, which was outside the district entirely.

In 1975, Sultan Alimirah Hanfare was exiled to Saudi Arabia, but returned after the fall of the Derg regime in 1991. Upon Alimirah Hanfere's death in 2011, his son Hanfere  Alimirah was named his successor as sultan.

List of Sultans
 Kandhafo 1734–1749
 Kadhafo Mahammad ibn Kadhafo 1749–1779
 Aydahis ibn Kadhafo Mahammad 1779–1801
 Aydahis ibn Mahammad ibn Aydahis 1801–1832
 Hanfadhe ibn Aydahis 1832–1862
 Mahammad "Illalta“ ibn Hanfadhe 1862–1902
 Mahammad ibn Aydahis ibn Hanfadhe 1902–1910
 Yayyo ibn Mahammad ibn Hanfadhe 1902–1927
 Mahammad Yayyo 1927–1944
Alimirah Hanfare 1944–1975, 1991–2011
 Hanfare Alimirah 2011-2020
Ahmed Alimirah 2020

See also
Afar Region
List of Sunni Muslim dynasties
Afar people

Notes

References
Mordechai Abir, The era of the princes: the challenge of Islam and the re-unification of the Christian empire, 1769-1855 (London: Longmans, 1968).
J. Spencer Trimingham, Islam in Ethiopia (Oxford: Geoffrey Cumberlege for the University Press, 1952).

Afar people
History of Ethiopia
Sultanates
1734 establishments in Africa
Former monarchies